Secret Agent: Mission One is a 1983 video game published by Jor-And.

Gameplay
Secret Agent is a game in which the player has a limited amount of time to finish.

Reception
James A McPherson reviewed the game for Computer Gaming World, and stated that "The game is very playable. My previous encounters with games of this type sometimes left me stuck in situations that to me had no logical answer in relationship to the game scenario. The answers or actions required in Secret Agent, while hard, are logical to the surroundings."

References

External links
Review in Softalk
Review in Electronic Fun with Computers & Games
Entry in The Book of Adventure Games

1983 video games